Carepalxis is a genus of orb-weaver spiders first described by Ludwig Carl Christian Koch in 1872. These spiders only build webs at night and break them down in the morning.

Species
 it contains twelve species:
Carepalxis beelzebub (Hasselt, 1873) — Australia (Victoria)
Carepalxis bilobata Keyserling, 1886 — Australia (Queensland)
Carepalxis camelus Simon, 1895 — Paraguay, Argentina
Carepalxis coronata (Rainbow, 1896) — Australia (New South Wales)
Carepalxis lichensis Rainbow, 1916 — Australia (Queensland)
Carepalxis montifera L. Koch, 1872 — Australia (Queensland)
Carepalxis perpera (Petrunkevitch, 1911) — Mexico
Carepalxis poweri Rainbow, 1916 — Australia (New South Wales)
Carepalxis salobrensis Simon, 1895 — Jamaica, Mexico to Brazil
Carepalxis suberosa Thorell, 1881 — New Guinea
Carepalxis tricuspidata Chrysanthus, 1961 — New Guinea
Carepalxis tuberculata Keyserling, 1886 — Australia (Queensland, New South Wales)

References

Araneidae
Araneomorphae genera
Cosmopolitan spiders